Xiyu Township (Pha̍k-fa-sṳ: Sî-yí-hiông) is a rural township encompassing Xiyu/Si Island/Hsi Island, also known as Fisher Island, Yuweng or Pescadores Island, which is among the three major islands of the Penghu County (the Pescadores), Taiwan. It has a population of 8,438 and an area of 18.7148 square kilometres.

The major scenic spots include some forts and lighthouse. They were built or reconstructed in the Qing Dynasty, and were credited as National Relic Site of Taiwan.

History
On July 16, 1683, the island was attacked by Qing forces in the Battle of Penghu.

On March 10, 2012, President Ma Ying-jeou visited the area and participated in religious ceremonies at temples in the township.

Geography

The township includes two inhabited islands, Yuweng Dao (Yü-weng Tao, Gyoō-tō; 漁翁島; Hî-ong-tó) and Xiaomen Yu (Siaomen Islet, Hsiaomen Island, Hsiao-men hsü, Shō-mon-sho; 小門嶼; Sió-mn̂g-sū), and one small uninhabited island, Haiqian Reef (海墘礁; Hái-kînn-ta).

Administrative divisions
The township includes eleven rural villages:
 Hengjiao Village
 Hejie Village
 Zhuwan Village
 Xiaomen Village on Xiaomen Island
 Dachi Village
 Erkan Village
 Chidong (Chitung)
 Chixi Village
 Chima Village
 Neian/Nei'an Village
 Waian/Wai'an Village

Tourist attractions
 Chuwan Crab Museum
 Erkan Chen Residence
 Penghu Great Bridge
 Xiaomen Geology Gallery
 Xiyu Eastern Fort
 Xiyu Western Fort
 Whale Cave: The Xiaomen Village located exclusively at Xiaomen Island is connected to the main island of Xiyu via Xiaomen Bridge.
 Yuwengdao Lighthouse

Transportation
Xiyu is connected to neighboring Baisha by the Penghu Great Bridge.

Notable natives
 Huang Ching-cheng, sculptor
 Tsai De-sheng, Director-General of National Security Bureau (2009-2014)

See also
 Penghu
 List of islands of the Republic of China

References

External links

Shiyeu Township Hall 
【離島風情系列-02】澎湖西嶼島風情 ('Outlying Island Culture Series Episode 2 - Penghu Xiyu Island Culture') 

Townships in Penghu County